The Apartment: Style Edition was the second season of the Asian reality television show The Apartment, which after six seasons is the longest running reality competition show in Asia. The concept is that eight pairs of people with one relation, friends, brothers, couples and even two strangers, were to cooperate to design one room each week for ten  weeks. The host of the programme, Jamie Durie, gave the challenge and a panel including Laurence Llewelyn Bowen judged their work. The final winners were announced after the last episode, and the prize was their own apartment in The Veo in the outskirts of Kuala Lumpur.

The winners by process of elimination was Dali, with contestants Iva and Philipe. The show was created by Riaz Mehta and produced by the Singapore-based Imagine Group.

Contestants 

As there were eight teams and ten episodes with the last having the two finalists, only six pairs could have been eliminated the previous nine episodes. This was solved by having two episodes without elimination and the reintroduction of one of the teams that were eliminated earlier. Glue & Glam, the first team to be eliminated, were brought back.

Episodes

Elimination 

 Green background and WINNER means the team won The Apartment Style Edition.
 Silver background and RUNNER-UP means the team was the runner-up on The Apartment Style Edition.
 Blue background and WIN means the team won that challenge.
 Orange background and BTM 2 mean the team worst challenge but safe.
 Red background and ELIM means the team was eliminated of the competition.

In episode 5, Team "Glue & Glam" returned to the competition

References

2012 Malaysian television seasons
Celebrity reality television series
Home renovation television series
Malaysian reality television series
Television shows filmed in Malaysia